The Eastern Downs colonial by-election, 1862 was a by-election held on 2 May 1862 in the electoral district of Eastern Downs for the Queensland Legislative Assembly.

History
On 22 April 1862, Ratcliffe Pring, the member for Eastern Downs, resigned. John Donald McLean won the resulting by-election on 2 May 1862.

See also
 Members of the Queensland Legislative Assembly, 1860–1863

References

 1862 elections in Australia
 Queensland state by-elections